Engelke (North German: from a pet form of Engel) is a German language habitational surname for someone from Anglia. Notable people with the name include:
 Anke Engelke (born 1965), German comedian, actress, voice actress and television presenter
 David Engelke (1953), American entrepreneur
 Helge Engelke (1961), German guitar player, composer, and producer
 Justin Engelke (born 1976), former South African cricketer
 Kai Engelke (1946), German writer, music journalist, reciter, singer-songwriter and teacher
 Matthew Engelke (1871–1946), American anthropologist and author specializing in religion, media, public culture, secularism, and humanism

See also 
 Engl (surname)
 Engl (disambiguation)
 Engel (surname) 
 Engels (surname)
 Engelman 
 Engelmann
 Engelkes

References 

German-language surnames
Ethnonymic surnames
German toponymic surnames
Low German surnames